Gustavo Semino (born July 7, 1977) is an Argentine footballer. His last club was Huracán de Goya.

External links

1977 births
Living people
Argentine footballers
Argentine expatriate footballers
Club Atlético Platense footballers
Club de Gimnasia y Esgrima La Plata footballers
Atlético de Rafaela footballers
Crucero del Norte footballers
Unión de Santa Fe footballers
Tacuarembó F.C. players
C.D. Huachipato footballers
Unión La Calera footballers
Rangers de Talca footballers
Expatriate footballers in Chile
Expatriate footballers in Uruguay
Association football defenders
People from Vicente López Partido
Sportspeople from Buenos Aires Province